The 1919–20 Welsh Amateur Cup was the 25th season of the Welsh Amateur Cup. This was the first time the Competition had been played, following a five-year gap due to World War I. The cup was won by Caerau who defeated Barmouth Comrades 4-1 in the final to become the second team from South Wales to win the Cup.

Preliminary round

First round

Second round

Third round

Final

References

1919-20
Welsh Cup
1919–20 domestic association football cups